The Shorts is an Australian Turf Club Group 2 Thoroughbred horse race for horses three years old and older, at set weights with penalties, over a distance of 1100 metres. It is held annually at Randwick Racecourse, Sydney, Australia in September. Total prize money for the race is A$1,000,000.

History

1942 racebook

Distance
 1867–1971 - 6 furlongs
 1972–2009 – 1100 metres
 2010–2011 – 1200 metres
 2012 onwards - 1100 metres

Venue
 Prior 2011 - Randwick Racecourse 
 2011 - Rosehill Gardens Racecourse
 2012 onwards - Randwick Racecourse

Grade
 1867–1978 - Principal Race
 1979–1993 - Listed Race
 1994–2006 - Group 3
 2008 onwards - Group 2

Winners

 2022 - Nature Strip
 2021 - Eduardo
 2020 - Classique Legend
 2019 - Pierata
 2018 - Ball Of Muscle
 2017 - Redzel
 2016 - Takedown
 2015 - Rebel Dane
 2014 - Terravista
 2013 - Sessions
 2012 - Pampelonne
 2011 - Love Conquers All
 2010 - Hot Danish
 2009 - Gold Trail
 2008 - Fritz's Princess
 2007 - †race not held
 2006 - Bentley Biscuit
 2005 - Black Ink
 2004 - Dance The Waves
 2003 - Lucky Night
 2002 - Empire
 2001 - Oamaru Force
 2000 - Bradshaw
 1999 - Ab Initio
 1998 - Mulugwa
 1997 - Hot As Hell
 1996 - Madison Point
 1995 - Moss Rocket
 1994 - Legal Agent
1993 - Chiliad
1992 - Classic Magic
1991 - Euclase
1990 - Rise 'N' Shine
1989 - Rigoletto
1988 - Potter Mcqueen
1987 - Mother Duck
1986 - Blazing Keel
1985 - Bemboka Spirit
1984 - Spritely Knight
1983 - Loch Ard
1982 - Marquee Star
1981 - Trench Digger
1980 - Hit It Benny
1979 - Biscawong
1978 - Tangfu
1977 - King's Favourite
1976 - King's Favourite
1975 - Purple Patch
1974 - Scarlet Man
1973 - Starplus
1972 - Kista
1971 - Welsh Prince
1970 - King Bogan
1969 - Grey Court
1968 - Somebody
1967 - Betelgeuse
1966 - Redcap
1965 - Levitator
1964 - Ferguson
1963 - Port Fair
1962 - Rush Bye
1961 - Tipperary Star
1960 - Merry Polly
1959 - Winchester
1958 - Cornelius
1957 - Reign
1956 - Aboukir
1955 - Lindbergh
1954 - Nagpuni
1953 - Nagpuni
1952 - Burncourt
1951 - Free Rule
1950 - Warrah King
1949 - Phalanx
1948 - Comedy Prince
1947 - Native Son
1946 - Chaperone
1945 - Warlock
1944 - Winnipeg
1943 - Marcondis
1942 - Soho
1941 - Winnipeg
1940 - Gold Salute
1939 - The Albatross
1938 - Thurles Lad
1937 - Beechwood
1936 - Some Boy
1935 - The Marne
1934 - Australia Fair
1933 - Golden Gate
1932 - Lightning March
1931 - High Disdain
1930 - Panola
1929 - Figure
1928 - Greenline
1927 - Calmest
1926 - Calmest
1925 - Bairn
1924 - Woodville
1923 - Duke Isinglass
1922 - Vodka
1921 - Greenstead
1920 - Elkin
1919 - Greenstead
1918 - Wolaroi
1917 - Mérimée
1916 - Colugo
1915 - Gigandra
1914 - Gigandra
1913 - Golden Hop
1912 - Gigandra
1911 - Hot Air
1910 - Maori King
1909 - Plush
1908 - Soultline
1907 - Mimer
1906 - Berthier
1905 - Machine Gun
1904 - Port Jackson
1903 - Ceres
1902 - Milos
1901 - Gameboy
1900 - Myosotis
1899 - Sequence
1898 - Johansen
1897 - Vivian
1896 - Old Clo
1895 - Waterfall
1894 - Wakawatea
1893 - Moorefield
1892 - Victor Hugo
1891 - Alexander
1890 - Alchemist
1889 - May Queen
1888 - Tilburn
1887 - The Felon
1886 - My Lord
1885 - Wanda
1884 - Brian O'Lynn
1883 - Blue And White
1882 - Twilight
1881 - Surrey
1880 - Chesterfield
1879 - Chorister
1878 - The Judge
1877 - Ino
1876 - Eros
1875 - Express
1874 - Sweetbriar
1873 - Rosalie
1872 - Wombo
1871 - The Count
1870 - Deceptive
1869 - Lucy
1868 - Tippler
1867 - Gunilda

† Not held because of outbreak of equine influenza

See also
 List of Australian Group races
 Group races

References

1867 establishments in Australia
Sport in New South Wales
Horse races in Australia